On Lisp: Advanced Techniques for Common Lisp is a book by Paul Graham on macro programming in Common Lisp. Published in 1993, it is currently out of print, but can be freely downloaded as a PDF file.

See also
 Anaphoric macro

References

External links
On Lisp home page
Free versions of "On Lisp"
On Lisp in pdf-format
On Lisp in multiple HTML files
On Lisp in multiple HTML files (white on black)
On Lisp in a single HTML file
Piecing Together a Printed Copy of "On Lisp" -- includes the nine missing diagrams.

Common Lisp publications